Events in the year 1558 in Norway.

Incumbents
Monarch: Christian III

Events
22 January - The Livonian War starts.

Deaths

14 February – Trond Torleivsson Benkestok, nobleman, estate owner and overlord (born c. 1495).

See also

References